The Canton of La Trinité is a former canton in the Arrondissement of La Trinité on Martinique. It had 13,352 inhabitants (2012). It was disbanded in 2015. The canton comprised the commune of La Trinité.

References

Cantons of Martinique